Platylobium parviflorum   is a  shrub species that is endemic to Australia. It is a member of the family Fabaceae and of the genus Platylobium. The species was first formally described in 1795 by English botanist James Edward Smith but for many years  was included in Platylobium formosum. It was reinstated as a species in its own right in 2011.

References

parviflorum
Fabales of Australia
Flora of New South Wales
Flora of Tasmania
Flora of Victoria (Australia)
Plants described in 1795